Virupakshipuram is a part of Vellore city in the Indian state of Tamil Nadu.

Demographics
At the time of the 2001 Indian census, Virupakshipuram had a population of 12,431. Males constituted 51% of the population and females 49%. Virupakshipuram had an average literacy rate of 71%, higher than the national average of 59.5%: male literacy was 76% and female literacy was 66%. 9% of the population were under 6 years of age.

References

Cities and towns in Vellore district